Rajmahal Lok Sabha constituency is one of the 14 Lok Sabha (parliamentary)  constituencies in Jharkhand state in eastern India. This constituency covers the entire Sahebganj and Pakur districts. This constituency is reserved for the candidates belonging to the Scheduled tribes.

Assembly segments
Presently, Rajmahal Lok Sabha constituency comprises the following six Vidhan Sabha (legislative assembly) segments:

Members of Parliament
1957: Paika Murmu, Indian National Congress
1962: Iswar Marandi, Jharkhand Party
1967: Iswar Marandi, Jharkhand Party
1971: Iswar Marandi, Indian National Congress
1977: Anthony Murmu, Janata Party
1980: Seth Hembram, Indian National Congress
1984: Seth Hembram, Indian National Congress
1989: Simon Marandi, Jharkhand Mukti Morcha
1991: Simon Marandi, Jharkhand Mukti Morcha
1996: Thomas Hansda, Indian National Congress
1998: Som Marandi, Bharatiya Janata Party
1999: Thomas Hansda, Indian National Congress
2004: Hemlal Murmu, Jharkhand Mukti Morcha
2009: Devidhan Besra, Bharatiya Janata Party
2014: Vijay Kumar Hansdak, Jharkhand Mukti Morcha
2019: Vijay Kumar Hansdak, Jharkhand Mukti Morcha

Elections Results

See also
 Sahebganj district
 Pakur district
 List of Constituencies of the Lok Sabha

Notes

External links
Rajmahal lok sabha  constituency election 2019 result details

Lok Sabha constituencies in Jharkhand
Sahibganj district
Pakur district